Public artworks in Berlin include:

 Alexander von Humboldt Memorial
 Altgermanische Wisentjagd
 Amazone zu Pferde (Kiss)
 Amazone zu Pferde (Tuaillon)
 Arc de 124,5°
 Athena Arms the Warrior
 Athena Leads the Young Warrior into the Fight
 Athena Protects the Young Hero
 Athena Teaches the Young Man How to Use a Weapon
 Beethoven–Haydn–Mozart Memorial
 Berlin (sculpture)
 Berlin Victory Column
 Bismarck Memorial
 Bison (Siemering)
 Blücher Memorial
 Borghese Gladiators
 The Boxers
 Bülow Memorial
 Bust of Carl Legien
 Bust of Wilhelm Leuschner
 Centaur and Nymph
 Churfürstliche Fuchsjagd
 Die Humpty-Dumpty-Maschine der totalen Zukunft
 Eberjagd um 1500
 Equestrian statue of Frederick William IV
 Equestrian statue of Friedrich Wilhelm I
 Gneisenau Memorial
 Goethe Monument
 Hasenhatz zur Rokokozeit
 Hercules and the Erymanthian Boar
 Hercules and the Nemean Lion
 Hunne zu Pferde
 Indischer Brunnen
 Iris Takes the Fallen Hero to Olympus
 Klingende Blume
 Lebensalter
 Lessing Monument
 Löwe
 Löwenkämpfer
 Memoria Urbana Berlin
 Memorial to the Murdered Jews of Europe
 Mercury and Psyche
  Molecule Man
 Neptunbrunnen
 Nike Assists the Wounded Warrior
 Nike Crowns the Hero
 Nike Instructs the Boy in Heroic History
 Pony und Knappe
 Prometheus Bound and the Oceanids
 Richard Wagner Monument
 Rudolf Virchow Monument
 Der Rufer
 Scharnhorst Memorial
 Schiller Monument
 Siegessäulen
 Soviet War Memorial
 Statue of Albrecht Thaer, Berlin
 Statue of Albrecht von Roon
 Statue of Alexander von Humboldt (Bläser)
 Statue of Christian Peter Wilhelm Beuth
 Statue of Frederick the Great (Charlottenburg Palace)
 Statue of Friedrich Wilhelm von Seydlitz
 Statue of Hans Joachim von Zieten
 Statue of Hans Karl von Winterfeldt
 Statue of Helmuth von Moltke the Elder
 Statue of Hermann von Helmholtz
 Statue of James Francis Edward Keith
 Statue of Karl Friedrich Schinkel, Berlin
 Statue of Kurt Christoph Graf von Schwerin
 Statue of Leopold I, Prince of Anhalt-Dessau
 Statue of Max Planck
 Statue of Theodor Fontane
 Statue of Theodor Mommsen
 Tilted Donut Wedge with Two Balls
 Trains to Life – Trains to Death
 Volksgesang
 Wilhelm von Humboldt Memorial
 Yorck Memorial

Public art
Berlin